The canton of Saint-Pantaléon-de-Larche is an administrative division of the Corrèze department, south-central France. It was created at the French canton reorganisation which came into effect in March 2015. Its seat is in Saint-Pantaléon-de-Larche.

It consists of the following communes:
 
Chartrier-Ferrière
Chasteaux
Cublac
Estivals
Jugeals-Nazareth
Larche
Lissac-sur-Couze
Mansac
Nespouls
Noailles
Saint-Cernin-de-Larche
Saint-Pantaléon-de-Larche
Turenne

References

Cantons of Corrèze